Kaywa (Quechua for a Cyclanthera species, (Cyclanthera pedata or Cyclanthera brachybotrys) Hispanicized spelling Cayhua) is a mountain in the Andes of Peru, about  high. It is situated in the Huancavelica Region, Huancavelica Province, Acobambilla District, and in the Lima Region, Yauyos Province, Huantán District. Kaywa lies west of Wich'iqucha and northwest of Quylluqucha.

References

Mountains of Huancavelica Region
Mountains of Lima Region
Mountains of Peru